South Korean girl group EXID have released three studio albums, one compilation album, five extended plays, and twenty-one singles.

Albums

Studio albums

Compilation albums

Video albums

Single albums

Extended plays

Singles

Subgroup
Members Hani and Solji form a subgroup called Dasoni in 2013, and later changed the name to SoljiHani in 2016. They have released three singles–two credited as Dasoni, and one credited as SoljiHani.

Other charted songs

Soundtrack appearances

Music videos

Notes

References

Discography
Discographies of South Korean artists
K-pop music group discographies